Kuka sä oot is the fourth studio album by Finnish rapper Cheek. It was released on 21 May 2008. The album peaked at number five on the Official Finnish Album Chart.

Track listing

Charts

Release history

References

2008 albums
Cheek (rapper) albums